Charles Edgar Littlefield (June 21, 1851 – May 2, 1915) was a United States representative from Maine.

Biography
Littlefield was born in Lebanon, Maine on June 21, 1851. He attended the common schools and Foxcroft Academy.  He studied law, was admitted to the bar and practiced in Rockland. Littlefield served as a fellow at Bates College from 1899 to 1915.

He was elected a member of the Maine House of Representatives 1885–1887 and served as speaker the last year.  He was elected Attorney General 1889–1893.  He was a delegate to the Republican National Conventions in 1892 and 1896. He was elected as a Republican to the Fifty-sixth Congress to fill the vacancy caused by the death of Nelson Dingley, Jr. Littlefield was reelected to the four succeeding Congresses and served from June 19, 1899, until his resignation, effective September 30, 1908. He was Chairman of the Committee on Expenditures in the Department of Agriculture (Fifty-ninth and Sixtieth Congresses).

He moved to New York City and engaged in the practice of law until his death there on May 2, 1915.  His interment is in Achorn Cemetery in Rockland.

References

External links

 

1851 births
1915 deaths
People from Lebanon, Maine
People from Rockland, Maine
Republican Party members of the United States House of Representatives from Maine
Speakers of the Maine House of Representatives
Maine Attorneys General
19th-century American politicians
Foxcroft Academy alumni